The Holmenkollen medal is Norwegian skiing's highest award for competitors. It signifies top placings in international championships and other international events, including the Holmenkollen events.

The medal is mostly awarded to skiers in the Nordic events.

List of medalists

Medalist breakdown
 162 medalists total as of 2012.
 Gender: 137 men, 25 women
 Skiing discipline: 63 cross-country skiers, 27 Nordic combined skiers, 26 ski jumpers, 15 multiple Nordic skiing disciplines (competed in cross country, Nordic combined, and/or ski jumping), 15 Nordic skiers (discipline not listed on information found), 5 biathletes and 11 non-Nordic skiers total (listed above).
 Nationality: 107 Norwegians, 15 Finns, 11 Germans (combines East Germany, West Germany, and unified Germany), 8 Swedes, 8 Russians (includes the Soviet Union), 3 Austrians, 2 Japanese, 2 Italians, 2 Swiss, 2 Poles, 1 Kazakh, 1 Estonian and 1 Frenchman.
 Holmenkollen victories: 230.
 Olympic medals (golds): 323 (136), including the medals of Eriksen and Stenmark.
 World championship medals (gold): 451 (216), including the medals of Bjørnbakken, Eriksen, and Stenmark.
 Two uncle-nephew combinations (Lauritz Bergendahl - 1910 and Lars Begendahl - 1939, and Harald Økern - 1924 and Olav Økern - 1950).
 Two sets of brothers (Hemmestveit - 1928, Ruud - 1937, 1947, 1948).
 One father-daughter combination (Martinsen - 1969, Skari - 2001).
 One father-son-grandson combination (Haakon VII - 1955, Olav V - 1968, Harald V - 2007)
 Five husband-wife teams (Alevtina Kolchina - 1963 & Pavel Kolchin - 1963, Toini Gustafsson - 1967 & Assar Rönnlund - 1968; Marja-Liisa Kirvesniemi - 1989 & Harri Kirvesniemi - 1998; King Harald V - 2007 & Queen Sonja - 2007; Ole Einar Bjørndalen - 2011 & Darya Domracheva - 2014).
 Three athletes who took the Olympic Oath (Falkanger - 1952, Ulvang - 1991, Ogiwara - 1995).
 Five future doping disqualifications (Yegorova - 1994 (caught in 1997), Lazutina - 1998 (2002), H. Kirvesniemi - 1998 (2001),  Chepalova - 2004 (2009), Johaug 2013 (2016)).
 One future lighter of the Olympic Flame (Belmondo - 1997).

References
Holmenkollen medalists - click Holmenkollmedaljen for downloadable pdf file.
2007 Holmenkollen medalists announced - Accessed March 18, 2007.
Holmenkollen medal presented to Estil and Hjelmeset - Accessed March 21, 2007

Norwegian sports trophies and awards
Nordic skiing
 
Awards established in 1895
1895 establishments in Norway
Holmenkollen